Enrico Sibilia (17 March 1861 – 4 August 1948) was an Italian Roman Catholic Cardinal and former Nuncio to Austria.

Early life and priesthood
He was born in Anagni. After entering the Seminary of Anagni and completing his basic studies he entered the Pontifical Roman Seminary where from 1878 until 1890 he studied for and received doctorates in philosophy, theology and a doctorate utroque iuris (in both canon and civil law).

He was ordained on 8 March 1884 by his uncle Biagio Sibilia, Bishop of Segni. He was appointed Honorary canon of the cathedral chapter of Anagni. He entered the diplomatic service of the Holy See in April 1890 and served as an Auditor of the nunciature in Colombia from 1890 to 1895 and was later promoted to chargé d'affaires serving in that role until 1898. He was created Honorary chamberlain of His Holiness on 21 December 1894. He returned to diplomatic work as an Auditor of the nunciature in Brazil from August 1898 to July 1901. He was transferred to the nunciature in Belgium until 1902 and again to Spain until 1908.

Episcopate
Pope Pius X appointed him titular Archbishop of Side on 30 July 1908. He was appointed as internuncio to Chile when the apostolic delegation was elevated to that rank in 1908. He was consecrated on 11 October 1908 by Rafael Merry del Val, Cardinal Secretary of State. He returned to Rome in April 1914. He was appointed Assistant at the Pontifical Throne that same year. He was a Vicar of Vincenzo Vannutelli. He served as Nuncio in Austria since he was appointed there on 16 December 1922.

Cardinalate
He was created and Cardinal Priest of Santa Maria Nova in the consistory of 16 December 1935 by Pope Pius XI. He received the red biretta from the president of Austria on 21 December 1935; and received the red hat from the Pope in 1936. He took part in the conclave of 1939 that elected Pope Pius XII. He was elected to the order of Cardinal-Bishops and suburbicarian see of Sabina e Poggio Mirteto on 11 December 1939. He died in 1948 at the age of 87 and is buried in Anagni.

References

1861 births
1948 deaths
People from Anagni
20th-century Italian cardinals
Apostolic Nuncios to Austria
20th-century Italian Roman Catholic titular archbishops
Pontifical Roman Seminary alumni
Cardinal-bishops of Sabina